Goal of the Dead is 2014 French horror comedy directed by Thierry Poiraud and Benjamin Rocher; written by Tristan Schulmann, Marie Garel Weiss, Quoc Dang Tran, Ismaël Sy Savané, and Laetitia Trapet; and starring Alban Lenoir, Charlie Bruneau, Tiphaine Daviot, Ahmed Sylla, and Alexandre Philip as association football players and fans who must battle zombies when the entire stadium becomes infected.

Plot 
When a former local star returns home to play a match, he receives a hostile welcome.  One of the local players is injected with infected steroids before the match, and he goes on a violent rampage.  The stadium quickly turns into a massacre, and virus spreads to both players and spectators.  The few uninfected humans battle to survive against the bloodthirsty zombies.

Cast 
 Alban Lenoir as Sam Lorit
 Charlie Bruneau as Solène 
 Tiphaine Daviot as Cléo
 Ahmed Sylla as Idriss Diago
 Bruno Salomone as Marco
 Patrick Ligardes as Coubert
 Xavier Laurent as Manu Litrac
 Sebastien Vandenberghe as Jeannot
 Alexandre Philip as Pitt
 Philippe Rebbot as Fred
 Sarah Suco as The gruff woman

Release 
Goal of the Dead premiered 27 February 2014 in France, where it was released as two separate films.  The two films were later combined for its festival screenings.  International theatrical release dates are expected to coincide with the 2014 FIFA World Cup in June.  It was scheduled to be released on home video in the UK on 7 July 2014.

Reception 
Jordan Mintzer of The Hollywood Reporter called it an "amusing and gory" film that suffers for its length.  Andrew Pollard of Starburst rated it 8/10 stars and wrote, "Despite its ludicrous-sounding plot, Goal of the Dead is a massively enjoyable movie."  Ben Bussey of Brutal as Hell called it "a perfectly entertaining film" that is "far longer than any light-hearted comedy horror movie really needs to be".

References

External links 
 

2014 films
2014 comedy horror films
French comedy horror films
French association football films
Zombie comedy films
2014 comedy films
2010s French films